The National Cancer Institute of Egypt  (Arabic : المعهد القومي للأورام) is an organization dedicated to treatment, management and developing a cure to cancer.

Breast Cancer Hospital 
Breast Cancer Hospital located in the first settlement. A suburb in New Cairo, is affiliated with the National Cancer Institute, Cairo University. The building was allocated by the state in 2010 after an increase in the number of women attending the institute, the process of operating and receiving patients began in 2013 to specialize in "Breast tumors, Radiation therapy and Mammography”. The hospital receives more than 250 patients per day and includes  80 beds, 3 operating rooms, intensive care beds. The hospital provides its services to all patients free of charge and receives all cases from all governorates at any stage of treatment.

Vision and Mission

Vision
Achieving leadership in the Middle East in various oncology fields of Cancer Education, training, Health Care and Research.

Mission
Excelling in training and education programs in all cancer-related scientific fields and provide post-graduate certificates.
Providing high standards of multidisciplinary medical care in an education and research-based environment.
Performing scientific research in the causes, prevention and treatment of cancer.
Serving the community by developing the general policies to combat cancer, establishment of national treatment guidelines, and raising cancer awareness.
According to quality standards in the educational and medical sectors.

NCI Journal (JENCI)
Produced and hosted on behalf of the National Cancer Institute, Cairo University, the Journal of the Egyptian National Cancer Institute aims at publishing original articles related to all fields of cancer in order to disperse up-to-date information to all medical personnel interested the cancer-related fields such as basic, applied and clinical cancer research.

References

External links 
 
 

Cancer organizations
Medical research institutes in Egypt
Educational institutions established in 1969
1969 establishments in Egypt